This is a list of cities and towns in Slovakia, called mestá (singular mesto) in Slovak. Although mesto is variously translated into English as "town" or "city", there is no such legal distinction in Slovak.

This list of cities and towns shows the city/town names first, region and then the town's population as of 31. 12. 2019. As of 25 September 2019, there were 141 mestá in Slovakia. (For German and Hungarian names of these towns, which are used by the respective ethnic minorities, see articles list of German exonyms for places in Slovakia and list of Hungarian exonyms for places in Slovakia).

List

{| class="wikitable nowrap sortable mw-datatable"
|-
! rowspan=2 style="border-right: none;" class="unsortable" height=50px |
! rowspan=2 style="border-left: none;" | City or town        
! rowspan=2 | District
! rowspan=2 | Region
! colspan=3 | Population
|-
! 2019 !! 2001 !! Change
|-
| height=25px |  || Bratislava || Bratislava I, II, III, IV, V ||  || 
|-
| height=25px |  || Košice || Košice I, II, III, IV ||  || 
|-
| height=25px |  || Prešov || Prešov ||  || 
|-
| height=25px |  || Žilina || Žilina ||  || 
|-
| height=25px |  || Banská Bystrica || Banská Bystrica ||  || 
|-
| height=25px |  || Nitra || Nitra ||  || 
|-
| height=25px |  || Trnava || Trnava ||  || 
|-
| height=25px |  || Trenčín || Trenčín ||  || 
|-
| height=25px |  || Martin || Martin ||  || 
|-
| height=25px |  || Poprad || Poprad ||  || 
|-
| height=25px |  || Prievidza || Prievidza ||  || 
|-
| height=25px |  || Zvolen || Zvolen ||  || 
|-
| height=25px |  || Považská Bystrica || Považská Bystrica ||  || 
|-
| height=25px |  || Michalovce || Michalovce ||  || 
|-
| height=25px |  || Nové Zámky || Nové Zámky ||  || 
|-
| height=25px |  || Spišská Nová Ves || Spišská Nová Ves ||  || 
|-
| height=25px |  || Komárno || Komárno ||  || 
|-
| height=25px |  || Humenné || Humenné ||  || 
|-
| height=25px |  || Levice || Levice ||  || 
|-
| height=25px |  || Bardejov || Bardejov ||  || 
|-
| height=25px |  || Liptovský Mikuláš || Liptovský Mikuláš ||  || 
|-
| height=25px |  || Lučenec || Lučenec ||  || 
|-
| height=25px |  || Piešťany || Piešťany ||  || 
|-
| height=25px |  || Ružomberok || Ružomberok ||  || 
|-
| height=25px |  || Topoľčany || Topoľčany ||  || 
|-
| height=25px |  || Trebišov || Trebišov ||  || 
|-
| height=25px |  || Čadca || Čadca ||  || 
|-
| height=25px |  || Rimavská Sobota || Rimavská Sobota ||  || 
|-
| height=25px |  || Dubnica nad Váhom || Ilava ||  || 
|-
| height=25px |  || Pezinok || Pezinok ||  || 
|-
| height=25px |  || Dunajská Streda || Dunajská Streda ||  || 
|-
| height=25px |  || Partizánske || Partizánske ||  || 
|-
| height=25px |  || Vranov nad Topľou || Vranov nad Topľou ||  || 
|-
| height=25px |  || Šaľa || Šaľa ||  || 
|-
| height=25px |  || Hlohovec || Hlohovec ||  || 
|-
| height=25px |  || Brezno || Brezno ||  || 
|-
| height=25px |  || Senica || Senica ||  || 
|-
| height=25px |  || Snina || Snina ||  || 
|-
| height=25px |  || Nové Mesto nad Váhom || Nové Mesto nad Váhom ||  || 
|-
| height=25px |  || Senec || Senec ||  || 
|-
| height=25px |  || Rožňava || Rožňava ||  || 
|-
| height=25px |  || Žiar nad Hronom || Žiar nad Hronom ||  || 
|-
| height=25px |  || Dolný Kubín || Dolný Kubín ||  || 
|-
| height=25px |  || Bánovce nad Bebravou || Bánovce nad Bebravou ||  || 
|-
| height=25px |  || Púchov || Púchov ||  || 
|-
| height=25px |  || Malacky || Malacky ||  || 
|-
| height=25px |  || Handlová || Prievidza ||  || 
|-
| height=25px |  || Kežmarok || Kežmarok ||  || 
|-
| height=25px |  || Stará Ľubovňa || Stará Ľubovňa ||  || 
|-
| height=25px |  || Sereď || Galanta ||  || 
|-
| height=25px |  || Skalica || Skalica ||  || 
|-
| height=25px |  || Galanta || Galanta ||  || 
|-
| height=25px |  || Kysucké Nové Mesto || Kysucké Nové Mesto ||  || 
|-
| height=25px |  || Levoča || Levoča ||  || 
|-
| height=25px |  || Detva || Detva ||  || 
|-
| height=25px |  || Šamorín || Dunajská Streda ||  || 
|-
| height=25px |  || Sabinov || Sabinov ||  || 
|-
| height=25px |  || Stupava || Malacky ||  || 
|-
| height=25px |  || Revúca || Revúca ||  || 
|-
| height=25px |  || Veľký Krtíš || Veľký Krtíš ||  || 
|-
| height=25px |  || Myjava || Myjava ||  || 
|-
| height=25px |  || Zlaté Moravce || Zlaté Moravce ||  || 
|-
| height=25px |  || Bytča || Bytča ||  || 
|-
| height=25px |  || Moldava nad Bodvou || Košice-okolie ||  || 
|-
| height=25px |  || Holíč || Skalica ||  || 
|-
| height=25px |  || Nová Dubnica || Ilava ||  || 
|-
| height=25px |  || Svidník || Svidník ||  || 
|-
| height=25px |  || Kolárovo || Komárno ||  || 
|-
| height=25px |  || Fiľakovo || Lučenec ||  || 
|-
| height=25px |  || Stropkov || Stropkov ||  || 
|-
| height=25px |  || Štúrovo || Nové Zámky ||  || 
|-
| height=25px |  || Banská Štiavnica || Banská Štiavnica ||  || 
|-
| height=25px |  || Šurany || Nové Zámky ||  || 
|-
| height=25px |  || Tvrdošín || Tvrdošín ||  || 
|-
| height=25px |  || Modra || Pezinok ||  || 
|-
| height=25px |  || Veľké Kapušany || Michalovce ||  || 
|-
| height=25px |  || Stará Turá || Nové Mesto nad Váhom ||  || 
|-
| height=25px |  || Krompachy || Spišská Nová Ves ||  || 
|-
| height=25px |  || Veľký Meder || Dunajská Streda ||  || 
|-
| height=25px |  || Vráble || Nitra ||  || 
|-
| height=25px |  || Sečovce || Trebišov ||  || 
|-
| height=25px |  || Svit || Poprad ||  || 
|-
| height=25px |  || Krupina || Krupina ||  || 
|-
| height=25px |  || Námestovo || Námestovo ||  || 
|-
| height=25px |  || Vrútky || Martin ||  || 
|-
| height=25px |  || Turzovka || Čadca ||  || 
|-
| height=25px |  || Kráľovský Chlmec || Trebišov ||  || 
|-
| height=25px |  || Hriňová || Detva ||  || 
|-
| height=25px |  || Hnúšťa || Rimavská Sobota ||  || 
|-
| height=25px |  || Hurbanovo || Komárno ||  || 
|-
| height=25px |  || Liptovský Hrádok || Liptovský Mikuláš ||  || 
|-
| height=25px |  || Trstená || Tvrdošín ||  || 
|-
| height=25px |  || Nová Baňa || Žarnovica ||  || 
|-
| height=25px |  || Šahy || Levice ||  || 
|-
| height=25px |  || Tornaľa || Revúca ||  || 
|-
| height=25px |  || Krásno nad Kysucou || Čadca ||  || 
|-
| height=25px |  || Želiezovce || Levice ||  || 
|-
| height=25px |  || Spišská Belá || Kežmarok ||  || 
|-
| height=25px |  || Lipany || Sabinov ||  || 
|-
| height=25px |  || Medzilaborce || Medzilaborce ||  || 
|-
| height=25px |  || Veľký Šariš || Prešov ||  || 
|-
| height=25px |  || Nemšová || Trenčín ||  || 
|-
| height=25px |  || Sobrance || Sobrance ||  || 
|-
| height=25px |  || Turčianske Teplice || Turčianske Teplice ||  || 
|-
| height=25px |  || Žarnovica || Žarnovica ||  || 
|-
| height=25px |  || Gelnica || Gelnica ||  || 
|-
| height=25px |  || Vrbové || Piešťany ||  || 
|-
| height=25px |  || Rajec || Žilina ||  || 
|-
| height=25px |  || Svätý Jur || Pezinok ||  || 
|-
| height=25px |  || Dobšiná || Rožňava ||  || 
|-
| height=25px |  || Poltár || Poltár ||  || 
|-
| height=25px |  || Gabčíkovo || Dunajská Streda ||  || 
|-
| height=25px |  || Ilava || Ilava ||  || 
|-
| height=25px |  || Kremnica || Žiar nad Hronom ||  || 
|-
| height=25px |  || Sládkovičovo || Galanta ||  || 
|-
| height=25px |  || Gbely || Skalica ||  || 
|-
| height=25px |  || Nesvady || Komárno ||  || 
|-
| height=25px |  || Bojnice || Prievidza ||  || 
|-
| height=25px |  || Šaštín-Stráže || Senica ||  || 
|-
| height=25px |  || Sliač || Zvolen ||  || 
|-
| height=25px |  || Brezová pod Bradlom || Myjava ||  || 
|-
| height=25px |  || Medzev || Košice-okolie ||  || 
|-
| height=25px |  || Turany || Martin ||  || 
|-
| height=25px |  || Strážske || Michalovce ||  || 
|-
| height=25px |  || Nováky || Prievidza ||  || 
|-
| height=25px |  || Trenčianske Teplice || Trenčín ||  || 
|-
| height=25px |  || Leopoldov || Hlohovec ||  || 
|-
| height=25px |  || Giraltovce || Svidník ||  || 
|-
| height=25px |  || Tisovec || Rimavská Sobota ||  || 
|-
| height=25px |  || Vysoké Tatry || Poprad ||  || 
|-
| height=25px |  || Spišské Podhradie || Levoča ||  || 
|-
| height=25px |  || Hanušovce nad Topľou || Vranov nad Topľou ||  || 
|-
| height=25px |  || Čierna nad Tisou || Trebišov ||  || 
|-
| height=25px |  || Tlmače || Levice ||  || 
|-
| height=25px |  || Spišské Vlachy || Spišská Nová Ves ||  || 
|-
| height=25px |  || Jelšava || Revúca ||  || 
|-
| height=25px |  || Podolínec || Stará Ľubovňa ||  || 
|-
| height=25px |  || Rajecké Teplice || Žilina ||  || 
|-
| height=25px |  || Spišská Stará Ves || Kežmarok ||  || 
|-
| height=25px |  || Modrý Kameň || Veľký Krtíš ||  || 
|-
| height=25px |  || Dudince || Krupina ||  ||

See also
Lists of cities

References

External links
Official web page of Statistical Bureau of Slovak Republic
Former names of all Slovakia´s towns and villages prior IWW (prior 1918)
Historical demographic data of Slovak towns from Populstat site by Jan Lahmeyer

 
Slovakia
Cities
Slovakia